Janine Theriault (born 1975) is a Canadian actress. She grew up in Yarmouth, Nova Scotia, where she lived until leaving to attend Walnut Hill School for the Performing Arts in Natick, Massachusetts. While there she majored in dance and also trained in voice.

Known for her work in the ensemble cast of the A&E TV original series, Bleeders (1997),  A Nero Wolfe Mystery (2001–2002), Theriault has appeared in television films and series including Stork Derby  (MOW, 2001) Owning Mahowny (feature film, 2002) and Monk. She also played a role as Miss Manderly in Felicity: An American Girl Adventure.

She also starred, (opposite Vincent D'Onofrio), in the acclaimed short film "Five Minutes, Mr. Welles" (2005).

On the stage, Theriault received excellent reviews for her performance as Élisabeth Vigée-Lebrun in the Joel Gross play, Marie Antoinette: The Color of Flesh, in which she appeared in 2008. Reviewer Brandon K. Thorpe wrote, "Theriault's [turmoil] belongs to a thinking woman. Even as she reflects this, she retains her grip on the quick-mindedness of the devoted social climber who rose from the mob to become best friends with a queen and who soon must find another place to alight. This is a lot to show on a face or in a voice, but she does it, and she never cracks for a second."

In 2001 she announced her intention to wed the English born Canadian musician John Southworth.

In 2010, Theriault appeared as "Nadia" in the Canadian premiere of the play Lenin's Embalmers, (by Canadian-born, Brooklyn-based writer Vern Theissen), in both Winnipeg and Toronto.

She and her husband currently reside in Montreal.

References

External links 

Canadian television actresses
Living people
Actresses from Nova Scotia
Actresses from Montreal
People from Yarmouth, Nova Scotia
1975 births